The List of members from the third term of the Assembly of Experts. consists of names of the members during the third term of the Assembly of Experts from 1998 to 2006. Elections for the Assembly of Experts occurs every 8 years.

"Assembly of experts (of the Leadership)", or the "Council of Experts" is the deliberative body empowered to appoint and dismiss the Supreme Leader of Iran; and Seyyed Ali Khamenei is the current supreme leader of Iran. Ali Khamenei was the Leader during this term.

The elections took place on 23 October 1998, with the Inauguration occurring on 22 February 1999.

Members 
The list is ordered Alphabetically.

Members with * next to their name, indicates they died while in office.

 Ardabil

 Khalil Boyukzadeh * (16 April 2001)
 Mir Ebrahim Seyyed Hatami (Replaced Khalil Boyukzadeh)
 Mostafa Norani Ardabili - * (30 October 2003)

 Bushehr

 Abdul-Nabi Namazi

 Chaharmahal and Bakhtiari

 Ebrahim Amini

 East Azerbaijan

 Ali Orumian
 Hashem Hashemzadeh Herisi
  * (11 September 2000)
 Mohsen Mojtahed Shabestari
 Seyed Abolfazl Mousavi Tabrizi * (14 April 2003)

 Fars

 Ahmad Beheshti
 Ali Mohammad Dastgheib Shirazi
 Assad-Allah Imani
 Seyed Ali Asghar Dastgheib
 Seyed Mohammad Hossein Hosseini Arsanjani -

 Gilan

 Abbas Mahfouzi
  
 Mohammad-Ali Taskhiri
 Zaynolabideen Ghorbani

 Golestan

 Habibollah Taheri Gorgani - 
 Seyed Kazem Noor Mofidi

 Hamadan

 
 Seyed Abolhasan Mousavi Dabestani -

 Hormozgan

  * (June 2001)

 Ilam

 Rahim Mohammadi -

 Isfahan

 Hossein Mazaheri
 Jalal Al-Din Taheri
 Morteza Moghtadai
  (Replaced Seyed Esmail Hashemi)
 Seyed Esmail Hashemi - * (11 September 1999)
  * (30 September 2006)

 Kerman

 Ahmad Khatami
 Ali Movahedi-Kermani
 

 Kermanshah

  
 

 Khorasan

 Abbas Vaez-Tabasi
 Abolghasem Khazali
 
 
 
  
 Mahmoud Hashemi Shahroudi
 Seyed Mahdi Abadi - * (20 March 2005)

 Khuzestan

 Abbas Ka'bi
 Ali Fallahian
 Mohammad Ali Mousavi Jazayeri
 
 Mohsen Araki
 Seyyed Ali Shafiei

 Kohgiluyeh and Boyer-Ahmad

 Seyed Karamatollah Malek-Hosseini

 Kurdistan

 Abdolqader Zahedi * (19 December 2005)
  

 Lorestan

  
 

 Markazi

 Ahmad Mohseni Garakani
 

 Mazandaran

 Hadi Rohani * (13 October 1999)
  (Replaced Hadi Rohani) 
 
  
 Sadeq Larijani

 Qazvin

 Ali Sheikh Mohmmadi Takandi -
 Seyed Hassan Mousavi Poor (Shali) -

 Qom

 Seyed Mahdi Rohani * (23 November 2000)

 Semnan

 Hassan Rouhani
  * (11 September 1999)

 Sistan and Baluchestan

 
 Seyed Mojtaba Hosseini

 Tehran

 Ahmad Jannati
 Akbar Hashemi Rafsanjani
 Ali Meshkini
 Gholamreza Rezvani
 Ghorbanali Dorri-Najafabadi
 Majid Ansari
 Mohammed Emami-Kashani
 Mohammad Mohammadi Gilani
 Mohammad Reyshahri
 Mohammad-Reza Tavassoli
 Mohammad-Taqi Mesbah-Yazdi
 Mohammad Yazdi
 Mohsen Kharazi
 Mohsen Qomi
 Reza Ostadi
 Seyed Mohammad Bagher Asadi Khonsari -

 West Azerbaijan

 Ali Akbar Ghoreishi
  
 

 Yazd

 Seyed Abbas Khatam Yazdi - * (11 September 2001)

 Zanjan

 Seyed Esmaeil Mousavi Zanjani * (18 December 2002)

See also 

 1998 Iranian Assembly of Experts election
 Assembly of Experts
 List of members in the First Term of the Council of Experts
 List of members in the Second Term of the Council of Experts
 List of members in the Fourth Term of the Council of Experts
List of members in the Fifth Term of the Council of Experts
 List of chairmen of the Assembly of Experts

References 

Assembly of Experts
Lists of office-holders
Electoral colleges
Politics of Iran
Government of the Islamic Republic of Iran
Assemblies in Iran